The history of the Jews in the Czech lands, which include the modern Czech Republic as well as Bohemia, Czech Silesia and Moravia, goes back many centuries. There is evidence that Jews have lived in Moravia and Bohemia since as early as the 10th century. As of 2021, there were approximately 2,300 Jews living in the Czech Republic.

Jewish Prague

Jews are believed to have settled in Prague as early as the 10th century. The 16th century was a golden age for Jewry in Prague. One of the famous Jewish scholars of the time was Judah Loew ben Bezalel known as the Maharal, who served as a leading rabbi in Prague for most of his life. He is buried at the Old Jewish Cemetery in Josefov, and his grave with its tombstone intact, can still be visited. According to a popular legend, it is said that the body of Golem (created by the Maharal) lies in the attic of the Old New Synagogue where the genizah of Prague's community is kept. In 1708, Jews accounted for one-quarter of Prague’s population.

Austro-Hungarian Empire
As part of the original Czechoslovakia, and before that the Austro-Hungarian Empire the Jews had a long association with this part of Europe. Throughout the last thousand years, over 600 Jewish communities have emerged in the Kingdom of Bohemia. According to the 1930 census, Czechoslovakia (including Subcarpathian Ruthenia) had a Jewish population of 356,830.

First Czechoslovak Republic

During the 1890s, most Jews were German-speaking and considered themselves Germans. By the 1930s, German-speaking Jews had been numerically overtaken by assimilated Jews speaking Czech; Zionism also made inroads among the Jews of the periphery (Moravia and the Sudetenland). In the late nineteenth and early twentieth century, thousands of Jews came to Prague from small villages and towns in Bohemia, leading to the urbanization of Bohemian Jewish society. Of the 10 million inhabitants of pre-1938 Bohemia and Moravia, Jews composed only about 1% (117,551). Most Jews lived in large cities such as Prague (35,403 Jews, who made up 4.2% of the population), Brno (11,103, 4.2%), and Ostrava (6,865, 5.5%).

Antisemitism in the Czech lands was lower than elsewhere and strongly opposed by the national founder and first president, Tomáš Garrigue Masaryk (1850–1937), while secularism among both Jews and non-Jews facilitated integration. Nevertheless, there had been anti-Jewish rioting during the birth of the Czechoslovak republic in 1918 and 1920. Following a steep decline in religious observance in the nineteenth century, most Bohemian Jews were ambivalent to religion, although this was less true in Moravia. The Jews of Bohemia had the highest rate of intermarriage in Europe; 43.8% married out of the faith compared to 30% in Moravia.

The Holocaust

  
In contrast to Slovak Jews, who were mostly deported by the First Slovak Republic directly to Auschwitz, Treblinka, and other extermination camps, most Czech Jews were initially deported by the German occupiers with the help of local Czech Nazi collaborators to Theresienstadt concentration camp and only later killed. However, some Czech Jewish children were rescued by Kindertransport and escaped to the United Kingdom and other Allied countries. Some were reunited with their families after the war, while many lost parents and relatives to the concentration camps.

It is estimated that of the 118,310 Jews living in the Protectorate of Bohemia and Moravia upon the German invasion in 1939, 26,000 emigrated legally and illegally; 80,000 were murdered by the Nazis; and 10,000 survived the concentration camps.

Today

Prague has the most vibrant Jewish community in the entire country. Several synagogues operate on a regular basis, there are three kindergartens, a Jewish day school, two retirement homes, five kosher restaurants, two mikvot, and a kosher hotel. Three different Jewish magazines are issued every month, and the Prague Jewish community officially has about 1,500 members, but the real number of Jews in the city is estimated to be much higher, between 7,000 and 15,000. Due to years of persecution by both the Nazis and the subsequent Stalinist regime of Klement Gottwald, however, most people do not feel comfortable being registered as such. In addition, the Czech Republic is one of the most secularized and atheistic countries in Europe.

There are ten small Jewish communities around the country (seven in Bohemia and three in Moravia), the largest one being in Prague, where close to 90% of all Czech Jews live. The umbrella organisation for Jewish communities and organisations in the country is the Federation of Jewish Communities (Federace židovských obcí, FŽO). Services are regularly held in Prague, Brno, Olomouc, Teplice, Liberec, Plzeň, Karlovy Vary, and irregularly in some other cities.

See also  

 Czech Republic–Israel relations
 History of the Jews in Czechoslovakia
 List of Czech and Slovak Jews
 History of the Jews in Slovakia
 History of the Jews in Carpathian Ruthenia
 Ethnic minorities in Czechoslovakia

References

Sources

Further reading

External links
 The Jewish Virtual Library - Prague
 Chanukah celebration in prague, by Jewish community of prague
 Chabad Prague